False breeching can refer to:
False breeching on the shafts of an animal-drawn vehicle;  see Breeching (tack)
False breeching on a firearm or other weapon;  see Firearm

See also
Breech (disambiguation)
Breeching (disambiguation)